Svetlana Vyacheslavovna Filippova (born July 8, 1990 in Moscow) is a Russian springboard diver. Filippova has won a total of three medals, along with her partners Nadezda Bazhina: (silver in Moscow, and bronze in Beijing), and Anastasia Pozdniakova (bronze in Guanajuato, Mexico), for the women's synchronized springboard at the 2011 FINA Diving World Series.

Filippova represented Russia at the 2008 Summer Olympics, where she competed for the women's springboard event, along with her teammate Yuliya Pakhalina (who eventually won the silver medal in the final). She placed nineteenth out of thirty divers in the preliminary round by two points behind Hungary's Nóra Barta, with a total score of 274.20 after six successive attempts.

References

External links
NBC 2008 Olympics profile

Russian female divers
Living people
Olympic divers of Russia
Divers at the 2008 Summer Olympics
Divers from Moscow
1990 births